St. Thomas the Apostle College is a Roman Catholic secondary school for boys in Nunhead, London. A co-educational Sixth Form was opened in 2015.

The school was rebuilt and the new school building was opened by the Archbishop of Southwark, Peter Smith, in January 2013. The original Catholic chapel, an important feature in the life of the school, was retained and is the focus for the Catholic and pastoral life of the students.

In September 2015, St Thomas the Apostle College expanded its provision by opening a co-educational Sixth Form.

History of the college
St. Thomas the Apostle College opened in September 1965 as St. Thomas the Apostle School.  The initial intake came from two schools – English Martyrs and St Francis.  In September 1967 boys from Archbishop Amigo also joined.  The founder headmaster was Mr W. Uden and his first deputy was Mr. D. Crawford.

The college became grant maintained in September 1994 and became known as St. Thomas The Apostle College.  In 1998 the college reverted to a voluntary aided status.

There are four houses, named after four English martyrs from the sixteenth century during the reign of Elizabeth I – Griffith, Gunstone, Saint John Jones and Saint John Rigby.  Some confusion can be found in the details of the houses, because St. John Jones went by the name of 'Griffith' during the sixteenth century.

Notable former pupils
Ademola Lookman, footballer
Roy Kennedy, politician
Nigel Quashie, footballer
Nyron Nosworthy, footballer
Romain Esse, footballer
Danny Haynes, footballer
Cody Drameh, footballer
Emmanuel Kwatchey, footballer
Emmanuel Onariase, footballer
Dickson Etuhu, footballer
Kelvin Etuhu, footballer
Tyrone Berry, footballer
Michael Timlin, footballer
Michael Mison, footballer
Alex Addai, footballer
Dennis Adeniran, footballer

References

External links
 St. Thomas the Apostle College website

Boys' schools in London
Catholic secondary schools in the Archdiocese of Southwark
Educational institutions established in 1965
Secondary schools in the London Borough of Southwark
1965 establishments in England
Voluntary aided schools in London
Training schools in England
Nunhead